James Theodore Beverly (born September 28, 1968) is an American politician from the state of Georgia. A member of the Democratic Party, Beverly has represented the 143rd district in the Georgia House of Representatives since January 2013. He has served as Minority Leader since January 2021.

Education 
Beverly earned a B.S. in Biology from Guilford College in 1990 and a doctorate in optometry from the Pennsylvania College of Optometry in 1994. He later earned an MBA from Wesleyan College in Macon, Georgia in 2006 and an MPA from the Harvard Kennedy School of Government in 2010.

Political career
Beverly won a House seat in a 2011 special election. Beverly serves on the Health and Human Services, Retirement, Small Business Development, and Special Rules committees.

The first bill Beverly proposed would expand the tax credit for companies that create jobs in poor neighborhoods.

Beverly was chosen as the House Minority Leader in November 2020, after former leader Bob Trammell lost re-election to the House.

See also

Georgia General Assembly

References

External links
 James Beverly at ourcampaigns.com
Vote James Beverly

1968 births
21st-century American politicians
Guilford College alumni
Harvard Kennedy School alumni
Living people
Democratic Party members of the Georgia House of Representatives
Salus University alumni
Wesleyan College alumni